USS McKeever may refer to more than one United States Navy ship:

, a patrol vessel and minesweeper in commission from 1917 to 1919
, a patrol vessel and minesweeper in commission from 1917 to 1919